Saurodactylus slimanii is a species of gecko in the Sphaerodactylidae family found in Morocco.

References

Saurodactylus
Reptiles described in 2019